Cyberbykes: Shadow Racer VR is a 1995 motorcycle racing game developed by Artificial Software and published by GameTek.

Plot
Cyberbykes is a futuristic motorcycle racing game with car combat elements. It takes place in a dystopian future wherein a group called the World Treaty Organization (WTO) has gained power throughout the world, stockpiling weapons in the process. The player combats the WTO with an armed "cyberbyke" vehicle.

Reception

In PC Gamer US, Steve Poole offered Cyberbykes a negative review, writing, "The single-player game is a bust, and there are plenty of games with network support that are more fun than this." Computer Game Review was similarly negative: the game has "not one shred of originality in game play, design or plot," the reviewers said. Writing for Computer Gaming World, Peter Olafson compared the game unfavorably to other racing titles on the market, and called it "rather woeful and dated". PC Zones Charlton Brooker was harsher still, giving the game a "Pants" award and calling it "horrid".

References

External links

1995 video games
Cyberpunk video games
DOS games
DOS-only games
Motorcycle video games
Racing simulators
Racing video games
Video games developed in the United States
Video games set in the future
Video games with stereoscopic 3D graphics
GameTek games
Multiplayer and single-player video games